Rosell Ellis (born February 19, 1975) is an American former professional basketball player.

High school & College
From 1993–1995, he played college basketball at the College of Eastern Utah. In 1995, he then moved to McNeese State of the NCAA Division I for his junior and senior years. During his senior year at McNeese State, Ellis averaged 18.5 points per game on almost 67 percent shooting.

Professional
After his college career, Ellis joined Deportivo Roca of Argentina for the 1997 season. Later that year, he joined the Des Moines Dragons of the now-defunct International Basketball Association for the 1997–98 season, becoming the league's fifth-leading scorer. He attracted scouts to his games but had an incident in January 1998. There were NBA scouts in the stands when Ellis lost his mind and put an IBA referee in a choke hold. According to Ellis, a referee, Bob Schoewe, was berating players as they lined up around the paint for free throws. Ellis snapped back at Schoewe, who denies insulting the players, and in turn gave Ellis a technical foul in retaliation. Ellis protested again and the ref called a second technical and ejected him from the game. Ellis ran to the scorer's table where Schoewe was reporting the ejection, leaped on the referee's back, and put Schoewe in a sleeper hold. A throng of coaches, players, referees, and security officers pulled Ellis away from Schoewe and brought him to the locker room. The IBA banned him for a year for this action. This action was after Latrell Sprewell's choking of his coach, thus Ellis was shunned by NBA scouts. Now, Ellis looks at this incident as one of his big misdeeds.

On October 2, 2000, he signed with the Detroit Pistons. However, he was waived on October 21.

Ellis joined the Perth Wildcats for the 2004–05 season as a late replacement for Jaron Brown, where he played both power forward and small forward. He was the best shooter in the NBL for that season, shooting 61% from the floor. He was named the Round 21 NBL Player of the Week in 2005. In the same season, he also collected the 2005 Gordon Ellis Medal, the Wildcats' highest individual player honour and the team's Best Defensive Player award. He set his NBL-career best 38 points and 15 rebounds vs Crocodiles on November 26, 2004. He finished the 2004–05 season with averages of 17.8ppg, 9.6rpg, 2.7apg and 2.0spg.

In October 2006, he signed with the South Dragons for the 2006–07 season. Ellis led the NBL in rebounding in 2007 by averaging 11.3 rebounds in 27 games. In March 2007, he joined the Alaska Aces. Later that year, he signed with the Townsville Crocodiles for the 2007–08 season. However, just two games into the season, he suffered a season-ending chest injury and returned to the United States for rehab.

In September 2008, he signed a new two-year deal with the Crocodiles. In March 2009, he re-joined the Alaska Aces. In July 2009, the second year of his two-year contract was terminated by the Crocodiles.

On December 15, 2010, he re-signed with the Townsville Crocodiles for the rest of the 2010–11 NBL season.

References

External links
Profile at Eurobasket.com
Crocs profile
NBL stats
PBA profile

1975 births
Living people
Alaska Aces (PBA) players
American expatriate basketball people in Argentina
American expatriate basketball people in Australia
American expatriate basketball people in the Philippines
American expatriate basketball people in Saudi Arabia
American expatriate basketball people in Venezuela
American men's basketball players
Barangay Ginebra San Miguel players
Basketball players from Seattle
Cocodrilos de Caracas players
Great Lakes Storm players
McNeese Cowboys basketball players
Perth Wildcats players
Philippine Basketball Association All-Stars
Philippine Basketball Association imports
Pop Cola Panthers players
Power forwards (basketball)
Powerade Tigers players
Small forwards
South Dragons players
Townsville Crocodiles players
Utah State Eastern Golden Eagles men's basketball players
Yakima Sun Kings players